Cytochalasin D is a member of the class of mycotoxins known as cytochalasins. Cytochalasin D is an alkaloid produced by Helminthosporium and other molds.

Cytochalasin D is a cell-permeable and potent inhibitor of actin polymerization. It disrupts actin microfilaments and activates the p53-dependent pathways causing arrest of the cell cycle at the G1-S transition. It is believed to bind to F-actin polymer and prevent polymerization of actin monomers.

References

External links
 

Mycotoxins
Actin inhibitors
Acetate esters
Vinylidene compounds